Rosie the Riveter is a cultural icon representing the working women of the United States during World War II.

Rosie the Riveter may also refer to:

 Rosie the Riveter/World War II Home Front National Historical Park, a national park in the United States
 Rosie the Riveter (film), a 1944 film starring Jane Frazee
"We Can Do It!", a wartime poster frequently referred to as "Rosie the Riveter"
"Rosie the Riveter", a song by Suzy Bogguss from Song of America
Rosie the Riveter, burlesque dancer during WWII and mother of Russ Tolman

See also

 The Life and Times of Rosie the Riveter, a 1980 documentary film
 Rosie the Rocketer, scout attack airplane
 Rosie the Rocketeer, spaceflight test dummy
 Riveter
 Rivet (disambiguation)
 Rosie (disambiguation)